Tamao (written: 玉緒, 玉男 or 珠緒) is a feminine Japanese given name. Notable people with the name include:

, Japanese actress
, Japanese actress and voice actress
, Japanese puppeteer
, Japanese freelance announcer

Fictional characters
 Tamao Suzumi, a character in the Strawberry Panic! anime
 Tamao Tamamura, character from Shaman King
Tamao Tomoe, a character from the Revue Starlight franchise

See also
 31061 Tamao, an asteroid discovered on October 10, 1996
 Tamão, 16th century Portuguese settlement in today's Hong Kong

Japanese feminine given names